Rusty Leads the Way is a 1948 American drama film directed by Will Jason and starring Ted Donaldson, Sharyn Moffett and John Litel. It is part of the Rusty film series.

Plot

Cast 
 Ted Donaldson as Danny Mitchell 
 Sharyn Moffett as Penny Waters 
 John Litel as Hugh Mitchell 
 Ann Doran as Ethel Mitchell 
 Paula Raymond as Louise Adams 
 Peggy Converse as Mrs. Waters 
 Flame as Rusty

References

Bibliography
 Blottner, Gene. Columbia Pictures Movie Series, 1926-1955: The Harry Cohn Years. McFarland, 2011.

External links
 

1948 films
1948 drama films
American drama films
Films directed by Will Jason
Columbia Pictures films
American black-and-white films
Rusty (film series)
1940s English-language films
1940s American films